John Henry Vaughan MC KC (Fiji) (9 February 1892 – 16 April 1965) was a lawyer and ornithologist who served as Attorney General of Zanzibar and later as Attorney General of Fiji.

Early life
Vaughan was educated at Eastbourne College and then studied law at Corpus Christi College, Cambridge.

Career
He is best known for his work in the British Empire's legal service as Attorney General of Zanzibar in the 1930s, and then as Attorney General of Fiji from 1945 to 1949.

His work, The Dual Jurisdiction in Zanzibar, described the Protectorate's system of indirect British rule, whereby sovereignty technically remained with the Sultan of Zanzibar but with virtually all effective power in the hands of British-appointed officials.

He was also a botanist who collected plants from what is now Tanzania and Fiji.  He put together an important collection of plants from Zanzibar and the eastern provinces of Tanganyika.

Personal life
He married Thelma Green in 1925 and became a keen ornithologist.

Legacy
The Pemba white-eye derives its scientific name, Zosterops vaughani, from John Henry Vaughan, after whom it was named.

Publications

References

1892 births
1965 deaths
Alumni of Corpus Christi College, Cambridge
English ornithologists
British Army personnel of World War I
Attorneys General of the Colony of Fiji
Attorneys-general of Fiji
Chief justices of Fiji
Attorneys-General of the Sultanate of Zanzibar
Colonial Service officers
British people in British Fiji
British expatriates in Zanzibar
British Western Pacific Territories people
20th-century British zoologists
20th-century English lawyers